Manzoor Elahi (Urdu: منظور الہی) (born 15 April 1963) is a former Pakistani cricketer who played in six Test matches and 54 One Day Internationals between 1984 and 1995. His two brothers, Zahoor Elahi and Saleem Elahi have also played for Pakistan.

1963 births
Living people
Manzoor Elahi
Manzoor Elahi
Manzoor Elahi
Cricketers at the 1987 Cricket World Cup
Multan cricketers
Pakistan Railways cricketers
Zarai Taraqiati Bank Limited cricketers
Lahore City cricketers
Lahore Blues cricketers
Pakistan Starlets cricketers
Cricketers from Sahiwal
Pakistani cricket coaches
Punjabi people